Hugh Thornton (born June 28, 1991) is a professional gridiron football offensive tackle for the Calgary Stampeders of the Canadian Football League (CFL). He played college football at Illinois, and was drafted by the Indianapolis Colts in the third round of the 2013 NFL Draft. Thornton has also been a member of the Atlanta Falcons and Arizona Hotshots.

Early years
Thornton attended Oberlin High School in Oberlin, Ohio, and played for the Oberlin Phoenix high school football team. He also wrestled for the Oberlin HS wrestling team and in the 2008-2009 season placed third in Ohio at the OSHAA state tournament.

College career
Thornton enrolled in the University of Illinois, where he played for the Illinois Fighting Illini football team from 2009 to 2012. Following his senior season in 2012, he was recognized as a second-team All-Big Ten Conference selection.

Professional career

Indianapolis Colts

The Indianapolis Colts chose Thornton in the third round (86th overall) of the 2013 NFL Draft. He began his rookie season as a backup to Mike McGlynn and Donald Thomas at offensive guard. However, he was made a starter after Thomas sustained a season ending quadriceps tear in a week two loss to the Miami Dolphins, and would go on to start 12 regular season games at left guard as a rookie, in addition to the two playoff games that the Colts played in that postseason. In 2014, Thornton appeared in 10 games, 8 as a starter.

On December 28, 2015, Thornton was placed on injured reserve. He played in 13 games in the 2015 season, 12 as a starter.

On September 3, 2016, Thornton was placed on injured reserve.

Atlanta Falcons
On March 21, 2017, Thornton signed with the Atlanta Falcons. On May 9, 2017, Thornton announced his retirement.

Arizona Hotshots
In 2019, Thornton came out of retirement and joined the Arizona Hotshots of the Alliance of American Football. He was placed on injured reserve on January 30, 2019. He was activated from injured reserve on March 13, 2019.

Washington Redskins
On July 31, 2019, Thornton signed with the Washington Redskins. He was waived on August 31, 2019.

Calgary Stampeders
On April 8, 2022, Thornton signed with the Calgary Stampeders of the Canadian Football League (CFL).

Personal
When Thornton was twelve years old, his mother and sister were murdered by his mother's ex-boyfriend in his childhood home in Jamaica.

References

External links
Indianapolis Colts bio
Illinois Fighting Illini bio

1991 births
Living people
Sportspeople from Boise, Idaho
Players of American football from Idaho
American football offensive guards
Illinois Fighting Illini football players
Indianapolis Colts players
Atlanta Falcons players
Arizona Hotshots players
Washington Redskins players
Calgary Stampeders players